Jim Beam is an American brand of bourbon whiskey produced in Clermont, Kentucky, by Beam Suntory. It is one of the best-selling brands of bourbon in the world. Since 1795 (interrupted by Prohibition), seven generations of the Beam family have been involved in whiskey production for the company that produces the brand. The brand name became "Jim Beam" in 1943 in honor of James B. Beam, who rebuilt the business after Prohibition ended. Previously produced by the Beam family and later owned by the Fortune Brands holding company, the brand was purchased by Suntory Holdings in 2014.

History
During the late 18th century, members of the Böhm family, who eventually changed the spelling of their surname to "Beam", emigrated from Germany and settled in Kentucky.

Johannes "Jacob" Beam (1760–1834) was a farmer who began producing whiskey in the style that became bourbon. Jacob Beam sold his first barrels of corn whiskey around 1795, then called Old Jake Beam Sour Mash.

Jacob Beam's son David Beam (1802–1854) took on his father's responsibilities in 1820 at the age of 18, expanding distribution of the family's bourbon during a time of Industrial Revolution. David M. Beam (1833–1913) in 1854 moved the distillery to Nelson County to capitalize on the growing network of railroad lines connecting states.

Until 1880, customers would bring their own jugs to the distillery to fill them with whiskey. In 1880, the company started bottling the product and selling it nationally under the brand name "Old Tub".

James Beauregard Beam (1864–1947) managed the family business before and after Prohibition, rebuilding the distillery in 1933–1934 in Clermont, Kentucky, near his Bardstown home.

In 1943, the brand name was changed from "Old Tub" to "Jim Beam", after James Beauregard Beam, and some of the bottle labels bear the statement, "None Genuine Without My Signature" with the signature James B. Beam. In 1945, the company was purchased by Harry Blum, a Chicago spirits merchant. The Beam company was purchased by American Brands in 1968.

T. Jeremiah Beam (1899–1977) started working at the Clear Springs distillery in 1913, later becoming the master distiller and overseeing operations at the new Clermont facility. Jeremiah Beam eventually gained full ownership and opened a second distillery near Boston, Kentucky, in 1954. Jeremiah later teamed up with childhood friend Jimberlain Joseph Quinn, to expand the enterprise.

Booker Noe (Frederick Booker Noe II, 1929–2004), grandson of Jim Beam, was the Master Distiller at the Jim Beam Distillery for more than 40 years, working closely with Master Distiller Jerry Dalton. In 1987 Booker introduced his namesake bourbon, Booker's, the company's first uncut, straight-from-the-barrel bourbon, and the first of the company's "Small Batch Bourbon Collection".

Fred Noe (Frederick Booker Noe III, 1957–) became the seventh generation Beam family distiller in 2007 and regularly travels for promotional purposes.

In 1987, Jim Beam purchased National Distillers, acquiring brands including Old Crow, Bourbon de Luxe, Old Taylor, Old Grand-Dad, and Sunny Brook. Old Taylor was subsequently sold to the Sazerac Company.

On August 4, 2003, a fire destroyed a Jim Beam aging warehouse in Bardstown, Kentucky. It held 15,000 barrels of bourbon. Flames rose more than 100 feet from the structure. Burning bourbon spilled from the warehouse into a nearby creek. An estimated 19,000 fish died of the bourbon in the creek and a river.

Jim Beam was part of the holding company formerly known as Fortune Brands that was dismantled in 2011. Other parts of the remaining company were spun off as an IPO on the NYSE on the same day, as Fortune Brands Home & Security, and the liquor division of the holding company was renamed Beam, Inc. on October 4, 2011. In January 2014, it was announced that Beam Inc. would be purchased by Suntory Holdings Ltd., a Japanese group of brewers & distillers known for producing Japan's first whiskey. The combined company is known as Beam Suntory.

On July 3, 2019, another warehouse caught ablaze which destroyed around 45,000 barrels of bourbon. The fire led to the spillage of bourbon into the Kentucky River and Glenns Creek. Learning from the 2003 fire it was decided not to use water, letting it burn itself out to reduce runoff into the ecosystem.  The estimated cost of the fire to Beam Suntory was around $45 million.

The Kentucky Energy and Environment Cabinet (KEEC) released a statement via their official Facebook page stating the alcohol plume had reached  between Owenton and Carrollton. The KEEC along with local and federal agencies used aeration to increase the oxygen levels in the water to prevent additional fish kill.

Distillers
 Freddie Noe (1988–present)
 Fred Noe (1957–present)
 Fred Booker Noe II (1929–2004)
 T. Jeremiah Beam (1899–1977)
 James B. Beam (1864–1947)
 David M. Beam (1833–1913)
 David Beam (1802–1854)
 Jacob Beam (1760–1834)

Distilleries

 James B. Beam Distilling Co. in Clermont, KY
 Jim Beam Booker Noe Plant in Boston, KY
 Jim Beam Old Grand Dad Plant in Frankfort, KY
 Fred B Noe Distillery in Clermont,KY

Products

Several varieties bearing the Jim Beam name are available.

Straight bourbon whiskey
 Jim Beam Original (white label) – aged 4 years in new charred oak barrels, 80 proof, the flagship whiskey
 Jim Beam Black (black label) – "extra aged"; was age stated at 8 years (6 years in export markets), but dropped the age statement at the beginning of 2015 – 86 proof
 Jim Beam Devil's Cut – aged 6 years, uses bourbon extracted from the cask's wood after emptying, 90 proof
 Jim Beam Bonded (metallic gold label) – aged 4 years, 100 proof, bottled in bond
 Jim Beam Double Oak (dark blue label) – matured in two barrels 
 Jim Beam Single Barrel -108 proof.

Premium bourbons
 Jim Beam Signature Craft bourbon whiskey – aged 12 years, 86 proof
 Jim Beam Signature Craft Quarter Cask Bourbon – bourbon aged at least 5 years and finished in a variety of quarter-size casks for at least an additional 4 years
 Jim Beam Harvest Collection (limited release) – six bourbons aged 11 years or more, each made with a particular secondary grain, including triticale, high rye, six-row barley, soft red wheat, brown rice, and whole rolled oat
 Jim Beam Distiller's Masterpiece – finished in Pedro Ximénez sherry casks – 100 proof

Straight rye whiskey
 Jim Beam Rye (green label) – rye whiskey, aged 4 years, 90 proof

"White whiskey"
 Jacob's Ghost – 80 proof, aged one year in uncharred barrels and filtered

Liqueurs
All are 70 proof (35% ABV) except Jim Beam Red Stag (40% ABV), Jim Beam Peach and Jim Beam Honey (32.5% ABV)
 Jim Beam Apple – with apple flavoring
 Jim Beam Honey – with honey flavoring  
 Jim Beam Kentucky Fire – with cinnamon flavoring
 Jim Beam Maple – with maple flavoring
 Jim Beam Red Stag – with black cherry flavoring
 Jim Beam Vanilla – with vanilla flavoring
 Jim Beam Peach – with peach flavoring
 Jim Beam Orange – with orange flavoring

Beam's "Small Batch Bourbon Collection" consists of several bourbons where the Beam name appears on the labels and marketing materials but is less prominent.
 Booker's: aged 6+ years, 120–129.2 proof (60–64.60% ABV)
 Baker's: aged 7 years, 107 proof (53.5% ABV)
 Basil Hayden's: aged 6 to 8 years, 80 proof (40% ABV); uses the Old Grand-Dad "high-rye" mash bill.
 Knob Creek: aged 9 years, 100 proof (50% ABV), with a 9-year, 120-proof (60% ABV) single-barrel expression, and a 100 proof (50% ABV) rye whiskey.

Several of these offerings have performed quite well at international spirits ratings competitions. For example, Jim Beam's Black label was awarded a double gold medal at the 2009 San Francisco World Spirits Competition. Jim Beam Black also won a Gold Outstanding medal at the 2013 International Wine and Spirit Competition.

Process
Bourbon whiskey distillers must follow government standards for production. By law, any "straight" bourbon must be: produced in the United States; made of a grain mix of at least 51% corn; distilled at no higher than 160 proof (80% ABV); free of any additives (except water to reduce proof for aging and bottling); aged in new, charred white oak barrels; entered into the aging barrels at no higher than 125 proof (62.5% ABV), aged for a minimum of 2 years, and bottled at no less than 80 proof (40% ABV).

Jim Beam starts with water filtered naturally by the limestone shelf found in Central Kentucky. A strain of yeast used since the end of Prohibition is added to a tank with the grains to create what is known as "dona yeast", used later in the fermentation process. Hammermills grind the mix of corn, rye and barley malt to break it down for easier cooking. The mix is then moved into a large mash cooker where water and set back are added. The "set back" is a portion of the old mash from the previous distillation—the key step of the sour mash process, ensuring consistency from batch to batch. The distillery produces two different whiskeys based on two different mash bills, each used depending on the product line.

The yeast is fed by the sugars in the mash, producing heat, carbon dioxide and alcohol. Called "distiller's beer" or "wash", the resulting liquid (after filtering to remove solids) looks, smells and tastes like (and essentially is) a form of beer.

A "bung" is used to seal the barrels before moving them to nearby hilltop rackhouses where they will age up to nine years. As the seasons change, natural weather variations expand and contract the barrel wood, allowing bourbon to seep into the barrel, and the caramelized sugars from the charred oak flavor and color the bourbon. A significant portion (known as the "angel's share") of the bourbon escapes the barrel through evaporation, or stays trapped in the wood of the barrel. Jim Beam ages for at least four years, or twice as long as the government requires for a "straight" bourbon. Aging for at least four years also allows the distillery to legally dispense with an age statement on the bottle.

Global markets
Jim Beam is one of the best-selling brands of bourbon in the world. Outside the United States, Beam Global Spirits & Wine has had a sales and distribution alliance with The Edrington Group since 2009.

See also

 Jack Daniel's, an American Tennessee whiskey
 List of historic whisky distilleries
 Maker's Mark, a premium sister brand of bourbon produced by Beam Suntory
 Robby Gordon Motorsports, a racing team sponsored by Jim Beam from 2005 to 2009
 2016 Jim Beam strike

Footnotes

References

External links

 

1795 introductions
Alcoholic drink brands
American brands
Beam Suntory
Bourbon whiskey
Bullitt County, Kentucky
Distilleries in Kentucky
Kentucky cuisine